Johann Jakob von Pistor (1739 - 1814), also known as Yakov Matveyevich Pistor, was an 18th-century German general who served in the Imperial Russian Army. One of the most notable commanders of Russian forces in the Warsaw Uprising (1794), he authored a memoir on both the fights in Warsaw and the entire Kościuszko's Uprising.

Bibliography

1739 births
1814 deaths
18th-century military personnel from the Russian Empire
German generals
Imperial Russian Army generals
Russian people of the Kościuszko Uprising